Ilona Jokinen (born 1981) is a Finnish soprano opera singer whose repertoire ranges from baroque to contemporary music.

Education 
Jokinen earned her bachelor's degree in singing pedagogy at the Helsinki Polytechnic.

Ilona Jokinen studied opera under Pirkko Törnqvist-Paakkanen and Ritva Auvinen at Sibelius Academy, Helsinki, Finland. She graduated in 2009. She continued her vocal studies with Tom Krause, and has attended master classes by Dorothy Irving, Sherrill Milnes, and Joan Dornemann.

Career 
Ilona Jokinen has held prominent roles at Savonlinna Opera Festival, Finnish National Opera, and other venues. She has performed as Fransquita (Bizet: Carmen), Vera (Kortekangas: Daddy's Girl), Thyra (Hakola: Vieriva kivi), Young Shepherd (Wagner: Tannhauser), and Susanna (Mozart: Le Nozze di Figaro).

Jokinen has performed with main orchestras and choirs in Finland, such as Lahti Symphony Orchestra, Cantores Minores and Tallinn Baroque Orchestra. Lied is well represented in Ilona Jokinen's concert repertoire. Recently, Jokinen has performed at Organ Night and Aria Festival in Espoo, Finland, and at the final concert at Helsinki Organ Festival. 

In addition to her homeland, she has sung in Japan, Ireland, Spain, and the United States.

Awards 
Jokinen has won prizes in Finnish national singing competitions and Lied music competitions, such as first prize in Pentti Koskimies lied competition and third prize at the Merikanto singing competition and Toivo Kuula competition.

References

External links
Ilona Jokinen Official Website
Sibelius Academy Website

1981 births
Living people
Finnish operatic sopranos
People from Lahti
21st-century Finnish  women singers